The Breeders' Plate is an Australian Turf Club Group 3  Thoroughbred horse race, for two-year-old colts and geldings, held with set weight conditions, over a distance of 1000 metres at Randwick Racecourse in Sydney, Australia in early October. Total prize money for the race is A$200,000.

History

The event along with the Gimcrack Stakes are the first two year old races in the racing season in New South Wales. Starters in these event must participate in trials a couple of weeks before these event to gain acceptance.

The following thoroughbreds have captured the Breeders' Plate – Golden Slipper Stakes double: Sky High (1960), Eskimo Prince (1964), Baguette (1970), Luskin Star (1977),  Sebring (2008), Pierro (2012), Vancouver (2015), Capitalist(2016).

1942 racebook

Distance 
1906–1972 - 5 furlongs (~1000 metres)
1973–2007 – 1000 metres
2008 – 1100 metres
2019 onwards - 1000 metres

Grade

1906–1978 -  Principal Race
1979–1991 -  Group 3
1992–2018 -  Listed Race
2019 onwards - Group 3

Venue
 1983, 2001 and 2004 - Warwick Farm Racecourse

Winners

 2022 - Empire Of Japan
 2021 - Sejardan 
 2020 - Shaquero 
2019 - Global Quest 
2018 - Dubious 
2017 - Performer 
2016 - Khan 
2015 - Capitalist 
2014 - Vancouver 
2013 - Law 
2012 - Whittington 
2011 - Pierro 
2010 - Smart Missile
2009 - Run For Wilson
2008 Oct. - Real Saga 
2008 Mar. - Sebring 
2007 - ‡race not held and postponed to 1 March 2008
2006 - Murtajill 
2005 - Super Savings 
2004 - Snitzel 
2003 - Charge Forward 
2002 - Ribald  
2001 - Choisir 
2000 - Mistegic 
1999 - Sparks
1998 - High Rolling
1997 - Mr. Innocent
1996 - Encounter
1995 - Clang
1994 - Ravarda
1993 - Marwina
1992 - Danger
1991 - Ghost Story 
1990 - Volts 
1989 - Bounce Again 
1988 - Show County 
1987 - Molokai Prince 
1986 - Maizcay 
1985 - Pre Catelan 
1984 - Take Your Partner 
1983 - My Mate Zero 
1982 - Palida Bay
1981 - Karioi Star
1980 - Iandra Lad
1979 - Prince Granada
1978 - ♯Big Convoy / Starmunda
1977 - ♯Smokey Jack / Karion
1976 - ♯Luskin Star /Star System
1975 - ♯Blue And Gold / Count Rajan 
1974 - Ein Prosit
1973 - 
1972 - Jewel Thief
1971 - Sovereign Slipper
1970 - Regal Gauntlet
1969 - Baguette
1968 - Shifway
1967 - Red Pilot
1966 - Pratten Park
1965 - Nebo Road
1964 - Peace Council
1963 - Eskimo Prince
1962 - Romanda
1961 - High Vista
1960 - Young Brolga
1959 - Sky High
1958 - Front Cover
1957 - Mighty Kingdom
1956 - Flying Kurana
1955 - Rumleigh
1954 - Kingster
1953 - Lindbergh
1952 - First Chapte
1951 - Joy Lad
1950 - Lloric
1949 - Nirandoli
1948 - High Jip
1947 - Riptide
1946 - Temeraire
1945 - Havoc
1944 - Magnificent
1943 - Victory Lad
1942 - Moorland
1941 - Bangster
1940 - Yaralla
1939 - Flying Knight
1938 - †Royal Sceptre / Beaucaire
1937 - Pandava
1936 - Rodborough
1935 - Gold Rod
1934 - Wise Boy
1933 - Fashion Star
1932 - Limarch
1931 - Caramba
1930 - Movie Star
1929 - Delwood
1928 - Gold Tinge
1927 - Ramulus
1926 - Beckwith
1925 - Rampion
1924 - Nincompoop
1923 - Heroic
1922 - King Carnival
1921 - Salrak
1920 - Vaccine
1919 - Cool Light
1918 - Bundella
1917 - Almoner
1916 - Baltic Sea
1915 - Wolaroi
1914 - Del Monte
1913 - Eugeny
1912 - Beragoon
1911 - Ventura
1910 - Cisco
1909 - Desert Rose
1908 - Zilka
1907 - Baw Bee
1906 - Boniform

† Dead heat

♯ Run in divisions

‡ Not held because of outbreak of equine influenza

See also
 List of Australian Group races
 Group races

External links 
Breeders' Plate 1000m Group 3

References

Horse races in Australia
Flat horse races for two-year-olds